The Old Red Lion is a pub and fringe theatre, at Angel, in the London Borough of Islington.

The theatre was founded in 1979 as the Old Red Lion Theatre Club. The pub was Grade II listed in 1994 by Historic England.

History

Construction
The pub in itself is one of the oldest in London, having first been built in 1415 in what was then the rural village of Islington in open countryside and fields.  A house called Goose Farm and some nearby cattle pens (for herds being driven to Smithfield Market) were the only structures to adjoin it, and St John Street (then called Chester Road) was a country lane.

18th century
In the late 18th century Chester Road became notorious for highwaymen, with patrols being provided to protect those travelling along it at night.  At this time descriptions state that the Old Red Lion was a small brick house with three trees in its forecourt, visited by William Hogarth (who portrayed it in the middle distance of his painting "Evening", with the foreground being Sadler's Wells), Samuel Johnson and Thomas Paine (who wrote The Rights of Man in the shade of the trees in its forecourt).

Reconstruction
The Old Red Lion was rebuilt in 1899, designed by Eedle and Myers, adding two exits onto different streets.  This gave the pub the nickname "the In and Out", since taxi passengers could avoid paying their fare by entering it through one door and disappearing through the other.

Theatre
In 1979 a small studio theatre opened on the pub's first floor, as the Old Red Lion Theatre Club. Under artistic director Charlie Hanson, it became a place for actors, directors, designers, writers and technicians to experiment. After the King's Cross fire in 1987, the theatre was threatened with closure due to the tightening of fire regulations. Artistic Director Ken McClymont raised funds to keep the theatre from closing.

Notable past productions
Nina Raine, winner of the 2006 Most Promising Playwright Award, staged her first show, Rabbit, at the Old Red Lion Theatre in  March to April 2006. Who is Eddie Linden, a play based upon Sebastian Barker's biography of poet and editor Eddie Linden, was staged in 1995.

Today
It is the main pub for the Capital Canaries, the official London fan club for Norwich City F.C.

Literary department
The literary department reads over 1,000 scripts each year, under an open submissions policy.

Artistic directors
Charlie Hanson (1979–1981)
Jane Goldman (1981–82)
Mike Gilmore (1982-74)
Richard Hansom (1984–88)
Ken McClymont (1988–2002)
Melanie Tait (2002–2004)
Helen Devine (2004–2010)
Henry Filloux-Bennett (Artistic Director 2010-2011) (Co-Artistic Director) (2011–2012)
Nicholas Thompson (Co-Artistic Director) (2011–2012) (Artistic Director 2012-2014)
Stewart Pringle (Artistic Director) (2014–2016)
Clive Judd (Artistic Director) (2016-2017)
Katy Danbury (Artistic Director & Theatre Manager) (2017–2019)
Alexander Knott (Artistic Director) (2019–present)

Awards
Old Red Lion Theatre won the Dan Crawford Pub Theatre Award for 2006.

References

External links

Old Red Lion

Theatres in the London Borough of Islington
Pub theatres in London
Pubs in the London Borough of Islington
Grade II listed pubs in London
Buildings and structures in Islington